Rudolf Burkert (31 October 1904 – 7 June 1985) was an Ethnic German Czechoslovak Nordic skier who competed in the 1920s and 1930s. He won a bronze medal in the ski jumping individual large hill competition at the 1928 Winter Olympics in St. Moritz, the first Winter Olympics medal in Czechoslovak history. He also finished 12th in the nordic combined event at those Olympics.

Burkert won two medals in the FIS Nordic World Ski Championships, earning a nordic combined gold in 1927 and a ski jumping silver in 1933.

He was born in Polubný, Kořenov, Bohemia. In 1968 he emigrated to West Germany, where he died in 1985.

References
 . Ski jumping profile
 . Nordic combined profile
 Rudolf Burkert's profile at the Czech Olympic committee 

1904 births
1985 deaths
People from Jablonec nad Nisou District
People from the Kingdom of Bohemia
German Bohemian people
Czech male Nordic combined skiers
Czech male ski jumpers
Czechoslovak male ski jumpers
Czechoslovak male Nordic combined skiers
Nordic combined skiers at the 1928 Winter Olympics
Olympic bronze medalists for Czechoslovakia
Ski jumpers at the 1928 Winter Olympics
Olympic medalists in ski jumping
FIS Nordic World Ski Championships medalists in Nordic combined
FIS Nordic World Ski Championships medalists in ski jumping
Medalists at the 1928 Winter Olympics
Czech exiles
Sudeten German people
Sportspeople from the Liberec Region